Alfie Haaland (born Alf-Inge Rasdal Håland; 23 November 1972) is a Norwegian former professional footballer who played as a right-back or midfielder. He is the father of current Manchester City player Erling Haaland.

Haaland played in the Premier League with Nottingham Forest, Leeds United and  Manchester City, and won 34 caps for Norway. He also had spells in his home country with Bryne FK and Rosseland BK. He retired due to a left knee injury. He had earlier also suffered an injury to his other leg that was caused deliberately in a tackle by Manchester United captain Roy Keane; the pair had a history of clashes on the field. 

Born in Stavanger and raised in Bryne, Haaland joined the youth academy of his hometown club Bryne FK in 1979, and made his first-team debut in 1989 aged 17. He signed his first professional contract with the club a year later. Haaland then moved to Premier League club Nottingham Forest in December 1993, making his debut against Leicester City. After a four year spell at the club, he moved to Leeds United where he had his first clash against Roy Keane. He was part of the Leeds team that reached the semi-final of the UEFA Cup and qualified for the Champions League. Haaland then proceeded to make his final transfer to Manchester City, where he clashed with Roy Keane several times allegedly resulting in long-term injuries, though he denounced these claims in 2003. On the same year Haaland took an eight-year break before returning to Bryne FK's third team and officially ending his career in 2013 with Rosseland BK.

Club career

Early life and career
Haaland was born in Stavanger and raised in nearby Bryne. He joined the youth team of his hometown club Bryne FK in 1979. He made his first-team debut in 1989, aged 17, and established himself in the team the following year after signing his first professional contract with Bryne.

Nottingham Forest
Haaland moved to England, joining First Division club Nottingham Forest after a protracted transfer. Attempts to sign Haaland started with Brian Clough in October 1992 but was completed under the management of Frank Clark in December 1993. He made his debut for Forest against Leicester City.

Leeds United
In July 1997, Haaland joined Leeds United under George Graham. He made his Leeds debut against Arsenal on 9 August. In September, when Manchester United were losing 1–0 to Haaland's Leeds United at Elland Road, Roy Keane injured his anterior cruciate ligament running for the ball with Haaland. As Keane lay prone on the ground, Haaland, unaware of the seriousness of the injury, stood over him and criticised Keane, suggesting that he was merely feigning injury to try to gain a penalty. Haaland was booked as Keane was stretchered off the field and was out of action for nearly a year afterwards. On 26 December 1997, Haaland scored a goal in a 3–1 defeat to Liverpool at Anfield, a feat later achieved by his son, Erling Haaland, on 2 October 2019 while playing for Red Bull Salzburg.

He was part of the Leeds team which reached the UEFA Cup semi-finals during the 1999–2000 season and which also qualified for the Champions League. Haaland was mainly used as a utility player, playing in both midfield and defence under David O'Leary.

Manchester City
In 2000, Haaland left Leeds to join Manchester City for a fee of £2.5 million. In April 2001, during a match against Manchester United, Roy Keane tackled Haaland, kicking him high on his right knee, for which he was immediately sent off. Of the incident, Haaland said: "I'm only glad my leg was off the ground, otherwise he would have done me a lot of damage". Keane was subsequently fined £5,000 and received a three-match ban. In his autobiography, published a year later, Keane stated that the tackle was a pre-meditated, deliberate act of vengeance against Haaland for the on-field criticism he received from him three and a half years previously. After this revelation, Keane found himself subject to an FA inquiry. He claimed inaccurate paraphrasing by his ghostwriter, but received an additional five-game ban and a £150,000 fine for bringing the sport into disrepute. Following the tackle, Haaland had initially claimed Keane would not dare to look him in the eye, and he once said: "I really dislike [Manchester] United and I can't stand their players".

At the time of Keane's tackle, Haaland's left knee was already giving him sufficient problems for him to have to play with strapping around it. After the tackle, Haaland finished the match and played a midweek friendly for Norway coming off at half-time, and the next league game, coming off in the 68th minute. That summer, he underwent surgery on his left knee, but only managed a further four substitute appearances the following season, and finally retired in July 2003 after failing to recover full fitness. Haaland was originally contracted with Manchester City until the end of the 2004–05 season, but in his contract it was stated that City could terminate the contract if medical conditions indicated that he could not play first-team football again, and decided to use this option.

Following the release of Keane's autobiography in 2002, Haaland and Manchester City stated that they were considering taking legal action against Keane. However, it emerged that Haaland had stated on his personal website that he had been playing with the injury to his left knee a few months, that his left leg did not receive a knock in the game (Keane kicked his right thigh), and that Keane did not cause his long term injury. Legal action was dropped in February 2003 after the club reviewed the medical advice.

Rosseland BK
Haaland came out of retirement after eight years, to play for the Bryne-based club Rosseland BK in the Norwegian Third Division in August 2011. He retired again in 2013.

International career
Haaland made his debut for Norway in friendly match against Costa Rica in January 1994. He was later named in Norway's squad for the 1994 FIFA World Cup where he played the matches against Mexico and Italy. Haaland was capped a total of 34 times, with his last international appearance against Bulgaria in April 2001. Haaland is – along with Hallvar Thoresen, Dan Eggen, Espen Baardsen, Hans Herman Henriksen and Joshua King – among the few players to have played for the Norwegian national team without ever playing in the domestic top division.

Personal life
His son, Erling Haaland, is also a professional footballer and currently plays for his former club Manchester City. His nephew, Albert Tjåland, plays as a striker for Molde FK.

Career statistics

Club

International

References

External links

1972 births
Living people
People from Bryne
Sportspeople from Stavanger
Norwegian footballers
Association football defenders
Association football midfielders
Bryne FK players
Nottingham Forest F.C. players
Leeds United F.C. players
Manchester City F.C. players
English Football League players
Premier League players
Norwegian Fourth Division players
Norway youth international footballers
Norway under-21 international footballers
Norway international footballers
1994 FIFA World Cup players
Norwegian expatriate footballers
Expatriate footballers in England
Norwegian expatriate sportspeople in England